"Qué Pena" is a song by Colombian singers Maluma and J Balvin. The single and its music video were released on September 27, 2019.

Background
Maluma and J Balvin announced their collaboration on "Qué Pena" on their social media accounts on August 20, 2019. This song is the first original collaboration between the two Colombian singers, after Maluma joined J Balvin on the remix of the latter and Nicky Jam's hit song "X."

Composition and lyrics
"Qué Pena" is an urban fusion track that contains elements of EDM and tango music. It is described as a seductive track in which Maluma and J Balvin try to convince a woman who they have met before to go out with them, only to feel embarrassed about the situation. They seem to remember her face, but not her name.

Music video
The music video for "Qué Pena" was directed by Colin Tilley and was filmed in New York City. The video shows Maluma and J Balvin making fun of each other as they attend a private party, where they both meet a woman who they can't fully seem to remember, but they are shown to have a good time regardless. The video has over 180 million views on YouTube as of May 2020.

Charts

Weekly charts

Year-end charts

Certifications

See also
List of Billboard number-one Latin songs of 2020

References

2019 songs
2019 singles
J Balvin songs
Maluma songs
Spanish-language songs
Sony Music Latin singles
Number-one singles in Colombia
Song recordings produced by Edgar Barrera
Songs written by J Balvin
Songs written by Maluma (singer)
Songs written by Edgar Barrera
Music videos directed by Colin Tilley